Ex-Girlfriends is a 2012 American romantic comedy-drama film written and directed by Alexander Poe and starring Poe, Jennifer Carpenter and Kristen Connolly.  It is Poe's directorial debut.

Cast
Alexander Poe as Graham
Jennifer Carpenter as Kate
Kristen Connolly as Laura
Liz Holtan as Samantha
Noah Bean as Tom
Matt McGrath as Professor O'Donnelly
Teddy Bergman as Paul
Will Janowitz as Matt
Ian Unterman as Ben

Reception
, the film holds a 29% approval rating on Rotten Tomatoes, based on seven reviews with an average rating of 3.31/10.  Matt Singer of Time Out gave the film one star out of five.  Chuck Bowen of Slant Magazine gave it half a star out of four.

References

External links
 
 

2012 romantic comedy-drama films
2012 films
American romantic comedy-drama films
2012 directorial debut films
2012 comedy films
2012 drama films
2010s English-language films
2010s American films